This is a list of megaprojects in India. "Megaprojects are temporary endeavours (i.e. projects) characterized by: large investment commitment, vast complexity (especially in organisational terms), and long-lasting impact on the economy, the environment, and society".

Aerospace

Defense

Engines

Spaceport

Rockets

Extraterrestrial Probes

Satellite-based Navigation

Science and technology projects

Laboratories, Observatories and Related Projects

Digital Public Goods

Medical Vaccines

Reservoir and Irrigation projects

Dams

Riverlink

Coastal Reservoir

Energy projects

Fertilizer Plant

Refinery

Solar Park

Nuclear Power Plants

Bio Gas

Bharat Mala projects

Bridges

Tunnels & Border Roads
Also see, National Highways and Infrastructure Development Corporation Limited, Border Tunnel Projects

Roads and Highways
Also see, Ministry of Road Transport and Highways

Char Dham Pariyojana

Sagar Mala projects

Big Ports

Big Public Sector ports are planned in Sagarmala project. 

There are also Private ports under construction/reopening

National Waterways
Also see, Ministry of Ports, Shipping and Waterways

Ferry

Rail projects

Freight Transportation

Passenger Transport

Higher-speed rail Project

Urban rail transit

RRTS

Normal System

Airways projects

Regional air connectivity

Air ports

Religious Projects

Sports Projects

Recreational Projects

Urban Development Projects

Manufacturing Projects

Defence Projects

Warship

Submarine

Drone warfare

See also
 Bharatmala
 Sagarmala
 Expressways of India
 Urban rail transit in India
 High-speed rail in India

References

Megaprojects
Proposed infrastructure in India
Economy of India lists
Infrastructure-related lists